The 2010 congressional elections in Kansas were held on November 2, 2010, and determined who would survive the state of Kansas in the United States House of Representatives. Kansas has 4 seats in the House, apportioned according to the 2000 United States Census. Representatives are elected for two-year terms; the elected served in the 112th Congress from January 3, 2011, until January 3, 2013.

Overview
Results of the 2010 United States House of Representatives elections in Kansas by district:

District 1

When incumbent Republican Congressman Jerry Moran opted to run for Senate instead of seeking an eighth term in Congress, creating an open seat. Republican State Senator Tim Huelskamp won in a crowded Republican primary that included Jim Barnett, a fellow State Senator and the 2006 Republican nominee for Governor; Rob Wasinger, the former Chief of Staff to retiring Senator Sam Brownback; Sue Boldra, a college instructor; Tracey Mann, a real estate agent; and Monte Shadwick, the former Mayor of Salina. Huelskamp faced Alan Jilka, the Democratic nominee and another former Mayor of Salina and Jack Warner, the Libertarian candidate. As was expected in this solidly conservative district that encompasses almost two-thirds of the state, Huelskamp overwhelmingly defeated Jilka and Warner and won his first term to Congress.

Polling

Results

District 2

Freshman incumbent Republican Congresswoman Lynn Jenkins, who was initially sent to Congress after defeating previous Congresswoman Nancy Boyda in 2008, was the only member of the Kansas congressional delegation to seek re-election this cycle. This conservative district that consists of most of eastern Kansas normally elects Republicans by large margins, so Congresswoman Jenkins was in no real danger of losing her seat to the Democratic nominee, community organizer Cheryl Hudspeth. Though Democrats hoped to make hay out of Jenkins’ claim that Republicans needed a "great white hope" to challenge President Obama, Jenkins was not vulnerable in the slightest and was overwhelmingly elected to her second term.

Results

District 3

This conservative-leaning district, which is based in the Kansas City metropolitan area and the college town of Lawrence, has been represented by Democratic Congressman Dennis Moore since he was first elected in 1998. This year, however, Moore declined to seek a seventh term to Congress, calling for a "new generation of leadership." On the Republican side, State Representative Kevin Yoder emerged from a crowded primary and became the Republican nominee, while Stephene Moore, a nurse and the wife of the retiring Congressman, won the Democratic nomination. Though the race was marked by sharp disagreement between Yoder and Moore, it was not a close election and Yoder was sent to Congress with a whopping twenty-point margin of victory.

Results

District 4

Based around metro Wichita and rural counties in the south-central region of Kansas, this conservative district has been represented by Republican Congressman Todd Tiahrt since he was first elected in the Republican Revolution of 1994. This year, though, Congressman Tiahrt declined to seek a ninth term and opted to run for U.S. Senate instead. In the Republican primary, businessman Mike Pompeo edged out several rivals, including State Senator Jean Schodorf and businessman Wink Hartman. State Representative Raj Goyle, who raised eyebrows when he was elected to represent a conservative area in the Kansas House of Representatives, became the Democratic nominee. The general election was contentious, and sparks flew when the Pompeo campaign tweeted a link to a controversial blog that referred to Goyle as "just another 'turban topper' we don’t need in Congress or any political office that deals with the U.S. Constitution, Christianity, and the United States of America!" The tweet, recommending the piece as a "good read", led to an apology from Pompeo. The Goyle camp attacked Pompeo for what they called "bigoted attacks" when a supporter of the Republican candidate sponsored billboards that said "Vote American, [v]ote Pompeo" and "True Americans vote for Pompeo." Pompeo went on to defeat Goyle, 59%-36%.

Polling

Results

References

External links
Elections from the Kansas Secretary of State
Official candidate lists
U.S. Congress candidates for Kansas at Project Vote Smart
Kansas U.S. House from OurCampaigns.com
Campaign contributions for U.S. Congressional races in Kansas from OpenSecrets
2010 Kansas General Election graph of multiple polls from Pollster.com

House - Kansas from the Cook Political Report

News coverage from The Midwest Democracy Project at The Kansas City Star

Kansas
2010
2010 Kansas elections